Database: The Journal of Biological Databases and Curation is an online peer-reviewed open access scientific journal that covers research on databases and biocuration. The journal was established in 2009 with David Landsman as the editor-in-chief. DATABASE is the official journal of the International Society for Biocuration. The journal has published the proceedings of the International Biocuration Conferences since 2009.

Abstracting and indexing 
The journal is abstracted and indexed in MEDLINE/PubMed, Asian Science Citation Index, and Chemical Abstracts. According to the Journal Citation Reports, the journal has a 2020 impact factor of 3.451.

References

External links 
 

Biology journals
Databases
Oxford University Press academic journals
Publications established in 2009
English-language journals